Diospyros buxifolia is a tree in the family Ebenaceae. Inflorescences bear up to five flowers. The specific epithet  is from the Latin, referring to the leaves' resemblance to those of the genus Buxus. Habitat is forests from sea level to  altitude. D. buxifolia is found widely from India to Indochina and in Malesia as far as New Guinea.

References

buxifolia
Flora of tropical Asia
Plants described in 1827